Krinsky is a surname that may refer to:
 Carol Herselle Krinsky, art and architectural historian
 Chaim Yehuda Krinsky (born 1933), Chabad Lubavitch rabbi
Julian Krinsky, American, former South African, professional tennis player
 Leah Krinsky, American comedy writer.
 Paul L. Krinsky, Superintendent of the United States Merchant Marine Academy
 Scott Krinsky, an actor.
 Vladimir Krinsky, a Russian architect
 Vikki Krinsky, played Taylor Woodall in Wild Card (TV series)
 Yehuda Krinsky (born 1933), American rabbi
 Yehuda Leib Krinsky, a nineteenth-century rabbi